The WD postcode area, also known as the Watford postcode area, is a group of eleven postcode districts in Greater London and Hertfordshire , within seven post towns. These cover south-west Hertfordshire (including Watford, Rickmansworth, Borehamwood, Kings Langley, Abbots Langley, Bushey and Radlett), plus very small parts of Buckinghamshire and the London Borough of Hillingdon.

Mail for this area is sorted at the Home Counties North Mail Centre in Hemel Hempstead, having been sorted at the Watford Mail Centre until its closure in 2011. The area covered includes all of Borough of Watford, most of the Three Rivers district, the London Borough of Hillingdon the western part of the Hertsmere district. WD3 also covers the village of Chenies in Buckinghamshire, plus a small protrusion of Harefield in the London Borough of Hillingdon.



Coverage
The approximate coverage of the postcode districts:

|-
! WD3
| RICKMANSWORTH
| Rickmansworth, Chorleywood, Croxley Green, Loudwater, Mill End, Maple Cross, Sarratt, Batchworth, Chenies, Harefield (part), West Hyde, Heronsgate, Chandler's Cross 
| Three Rivers, Buckinghamshire, Hillingdon
|-
! WD4
| KINGS LANGLEY
| Kings Langley, Chipperfield, Hunton Bridge, Rucklers Lane, Bucks Hill
| Dacorum, Three Rivers
|-
! WD5
| ABBOTS LANGLEY
| Abbots Langley, Bedmond
| Three Rivers, St Albans
|-
! WD6
| BOREHAMWOOD
| Borehamwood, Elstree, Well End
| Hertsmere
|-
! WD7
| RADLETT
| Radlett, Shenley
| Hertsmere, St Albans
|-
! WD17
| WATFORD
| Watford town centre, Cassiobury, Nascot Wood
| Watford
|-
! WD18
| WATFORD
| West Watford, Holywell
| Watford
|-
! WD19
| WATFORD
| Oxhey, South Oxhey, Carpenders Park
| Three Rivers, Watford
|-
! WD23
| BUSHEY
| Bushey, Bushey Heath
| Hertsmere, Watford
|-
! WD24
| WATFORD
| North Watford
| Watford
|-
! WD25
| WATFORD
| Garston, Leavesden, Aldenham, Letchmore Heath
| Watford, Hertsmere, Three Rivers, St Albans 
|-
! style="background:#FFFFFF;"|WD99
| style="background:#FFFFFF;"|WATFORD
| style="background:#FFFFFF;"|Jobcentre Plus
| style="background:#FFFFFF;"|non-geographic
|}

Recoding
In September 2000 districts WD17-19 and WD23-25 were created from the recoding of the WD1 and WD2 districts. BUSHEY is a new post town; having previously been part of the WD2 district of WATFORD. This was due to postcode exhaustion of WD1 and WD2 
Another reason for the postcode revision was the old WD2 area included Bushey with North Watford. Bushey was to all intents a section of Watford sorting office; up until 2000, all mail for WD2 was cut and tipped at Watford office. In order to change this, new codes were created to enable direct bags to be opened at Bushey delivery office.

Map

See also
Postcode Address File
List of postcode areas in the United Kingdom

References

External links
Royal Mail's Postcode Address File
A quick introduction to Royal Mail's Postcode Address File (PAF)

Postcode areas covering the East of England
Postcode areas covering South East England
Watford